The Freedom of Information and Protection of Privacy Act, RSA 2000, c F-25 (FOIP Act) is the freedom of information and privacy act for Alberta, Canada. It was passed by the Alberta legislature in June 1994 and came into force on October 1, 1995.

Purpose

History

In 2002, there were 62 changes made to the Act. This included amendments, references and potential changes to other acts such as the Traffic Safety Act, Vital Statistics Act, Election Act, Health Information Act, Mines and Minerals Act, Electronic Transactions Act, Occupational Health and Safety Act and the Municipal Government Act. The amendments recommended, that Alberta Energy "consider the protection of information provided in support of oil sands royalty calculations" the next time the Mines and Minerals Act is opened."

See also
Freedom of information in Canada
Personal Information Protection and Electronic Documents Act

References

Alberta provincial legislation
1994 in Alberta
1994 in Canadian law
Freedom of information legislation in Canada
Privacy legislation